Udea punoalis is a moth in the family Crambidae. It was described by Eugene G. Munroe in 1967. It is found in Peru.

References

punoalis
Moths described in 1967